Cezary Kucharski (born 17 February 1972) is a retired Polish football striker.

Kucharski was born in Łuków.  He played for clubs such as FC Aarau (Switzerland), Legia Warsaw, Sporting de Gijón (Spain), Iraklis (Greece) and Górnik Łęczna (Poland).

He played for Polish national team, for which he played 17 matches and scored 3 goals.

He was a participant at the 2002 FIFA World Cup.

Kucharski finished his career on 2 June 2007 in his home town of Łuków. After his playing career Kucharski has started a sports management company called CK Sports Management. He also acts as an agent for several players through Eurosportsmanagement Gmbh. Until February 2018 he managed Robert Lewandowski.

References

External links

Eurosportsmanagement

1972 births
Living people
People from Łuków
Polish footballers
Siarka Tarnobrzeg players
Legia Warsaw players
Górnik Łęczna players
2002 FIFA World Cup players
La Liga players
Sporting de Gijón players
Iraklis Thessaloniki F.C. players
Poland international footballers
FC Aarau players
Ekstraklasa players
Swiss Super League players
Polish expatriate footballers
Expatriate footballers in Spain
Expatriate footballers in Switzerland
Expatriate footballers in Greece
Sportspeople from Lublin Voivodeship
Association football forwards